The Ponte Pietra (Italian for "Stone Bridge"), is a Roman arch bridge crossing the Adige River in Verona, Italy. The bridge was completed in 100 BC, and the Via Postumia from Genoa to Aquileia passed over it. It is the oldest bridge in Verona.

It originally flanked another Roman bridge, the Pons Postumius; both structures provided the city (on the right bank) with access to the Roman theatre on the east bank. The arch nearest to the right bank of the Adige was rebuilt in 1298 by Alberto I della Scala. Four arches of the bridge were blown up by retreating German troops in World War II, but rebuilt in 1957 with original materials.

See also 
 List of Roman bridges
 Roman architecture
 Roman engineering

Notes and references

External links 

 
 Ponte Pietra - 360° Virtual Tour and photos

Roman bridges in Italy
Deck arch bridges
Stone bridges in Italy
Pietra
Bridges completed in the 1st century BC
Transport in Verona